Chanira Bajracharya (born 1995) is a former Kumari or Living Goddess of Patan in Nepal.

Biography 
She was born in Nepal, chosen as living goddess in April 2000, and enthroned when she was five years-old. In late-May 2001, she cried for four days in what was interpreted as a bad omen. The day after she stopped crying, the Nepalese royal massacre occurred. Her reign ended when she reached puberty at the age of 15 when she menstruated for the first time, as is customary for Kumaris. She was succeeded by Samita Bajracharya. Bajracharya is the niece of Dhana Kumari Bajracharya, one of the longest serving living goddesses, who reigned in Patan for three decades.

Bajracharya speaks fluent English, which she learned during her reign as Living Goddess. Following her retirement as Living Goddess, she studied business administration at Kathmandu University, eventually earning a Master of Business Administration.

References

External links
 100 Women at BBC Online
 The ex-Kumari: Chanira Bajracharya (Patan / Lalitpur)

Living people
BBC 100 Women
Deified women
Hinduism in Nepal
Buddhism in Nepal
Virgin goddesses
1995 births
People from Lalitpur District, Nepal
Kumaris (goddesses)